Colin Coughlan (born 2002) is an Irish hurler who plays for Limerick Senior Championship club Ballybrown and at inter-county level with the Limerick senior hurling team. He usually lines out as a half-back.

Career

A member of the Ballybrown club, Coughlan first came to hurling prominence as a schoolboy with Ardscoil Rís in the Harty Cup.  He made his first appearance on the inter-county scene as a member of the Limerick minor team during the 2018 Munster Championship. Coughlan was again eligible for the team the following year and lined out in defence as Limerick their first minor provincial title in six years. He progressed onto the under-21 team for the 2020 season before being drafted onto the Limerick senior hurling team for the 2021 National League.

Career statistics

Honours

Ballybrown
Limerick Minor Hurling Championship: 2019, 2020

Limerick
Munster Senior Hurling Championship (1): 2021
Munster Minor Hurling Championship: 2019 (c)

References

2002 births
Living people
Ballybrown hurlers
Limerick inter-county hurlers